Alina Cichecka (2 September 1916 – 12 March 2001) was a Polish gymnast. 

She was born in Warsaw. She competed at the 1936 Summer Olympics, in women's team all-around.

References

External links 
 

1916 births
2001 deaths
Gymnasts from Warsaw
Polish gymnasts
Olympic gymnasts of Poland
Polish female artistic gymnasts
Gymnasts at the 1936 Summer Olympics
20th-century Polish women